The 2014 Season is Mumbai City FC's 1st season in existence in the Indian Super League.

Background
In early 2014, it was announced that the All India Football Federation, the National Federation for Football in India, and IMG-Reliance would be accepting bids for ownership of eight of nine selected cities for the upcoming Indian Super League, an eight-team franchise league modeled along the lines of the Indian Premier League cricket tournament.

Mumbai were the visitors in the first ever ISL match on 12 October 2014, at Atlético de Kolkata's Salt Lake Stadium. With both Nicolas Anelka and Freddie Ljungberg absent, the side lost 3–0.

Signings

Foreign signings

Drafted domestic players

Drafted foreign players

Players and staff

Squad

Note:Numbers are referenced from those posted by the official ISL app.

Coaching staff

Indian Super League

League table

Results summary

Results by round

Matches

Squad statistics

Appearances and goals

|-
|}

Goal scorers

Disciplinary record

See also
 2014 Indian Super League season

References

External links

Mumbai City FC
Mumbai City FC
Mumbai City FC seasons